Egyptian Second Division 2010–11 is the 2010–11 season of the Egyptian Second Division competition. A total of 48 teams are divided into 3 groups based on geographical distribution. The top team of each group promotes to the highest Egyptian football level (Egyptian Premier League), The Season started on Monday 27 September 2010.

Promoted and Relegated before 2010–11 Egyptian Second Division

Relegated from 2009–10 Egyptian Premier Division 

 Ghazl El-Mehalla 14th   Joined Group C 
 Mansoura 15th   Joined Group C 
 Asyut Petroleum 16th   Joined Group A

Promoted from 2009–10 Egyptian Third Division 

Group A
 Maragha FC
 Nasr Mining FC
 Maghagha FC

Group B
 Zefta FC
 El-Sharqeya lel-Dokhan FC
 El-Gendi FC

Group C
 Al-Hamoul FC
 Bani Ebeid FC
 Matrouh FC

 Tanta FC was playing in Group C in 2009–10 Second Division, but now in Group B 2010–11 Second Division, that's why we have 4 teams promoted to Group  and 2 teams promoted to Group  in 2010–11 Season

Promoted and Relegated after 2010–11 Egyptian Second Division

Promoted to 2011–12 Egyptian Premier League 
  Telephonat Bani Sweif won the Egyptian Second Division (Group A)
  El Dakhleya FC won the Egyptian Second Division (Group B)
  Ghazl El-Mehalla won the Egyptian Second Division (Group C)

Relegated to 2011–12 Egyptian Third Division

League tables

Group A

Group B

Group C

Top 3 teams qualify for the 2011–12 Egyptian Premier League.
Bottom 3 teams from each group are relegated to the Egyptian Third Division for the 2011–12 season.

Results

Group A (Upper Egypt)

Group B (Cairo)

Group C (Lower Egypt)

References

External links
 The Egyptian Second Division Table 2009–10 Season
 The Egyptian Second Division Table 2010–11 Season (Lower Egypt)
 The Egyptian Second Division Table 2010–11 Season (Upper Egypt)
 The Egyptian Second Division Table 2010–11 Season (Cairo)
 RSSSF Second Level 2010–11

Egyptian Second Division seasons
2010–11 in Egyptian football
Egypt